Pomona Catholic High School is a private, Roman Catholic, co-ed middle school and all-girls high school in Pomona, California, established in 1898. It is located in the Roman Catholic Archdiocese of Los Angeles. It is a part of the tri-school community existing between St. Lucy's Priory High School and Damien High School.

History
Holy Name Academy, a boarding high school for girls, located on Holt Avenue in Pomona, California, closed its doors in June 1948. In September of that year, it was reopened by Monsignor English, pastor of St. Joseph's Church, as a high school for both boys and girls of the parish and surrounding parishes. Newly staffed by the Felician Sisters, it was re-named St. Joseph High School then after a few years changed the name to Pomona Catholic High School. It continues to provide Catholic education for students who come from as far as Riverside on the east and Baldwin Park in the west. In response to serious overcrowding, the Archdiocese of Los Angeles took advantage of the sale of the old Bonita High School facility in 1959 and split Pomona Catholic into two schools. Pomona Catholic Boys High School (now Damien High School) opened in nearby La Verne in 1959 to freshman boys only.  The last boys graduated from the original Pomona Catholic High School in 1962.  Currently, Pomona Catholic School consists of a co-ed middle school and an all-girls high school.

Notable alumni
 Ron Kadziel, former NFL player
 Debbie Mucarsel-Powell, U.S. Representative from Florida
Karen Seto, Yale University Professor and a lead author on two UN climate change reports.
 John Stewart, member of “The Kingston Trio” (1961-1967), composer of “Daydream Believer” 
 Geoff Vanderstock, Olympic track athlete
 Cisco Carlos, professional baseball player
 Marie Royce, U.S. Assistant Secretary of State for Education and Cultural Affairs
 Leslie Lopez, meteorologist for KABC 7 Los Angeles morning news.  https://abc7.com/about/newsteam/leslie-lopez/

See also

Damien High School

References

Education in Pomona, California
Roman Catholic secondary schools in Los Angeles County, California
Girls' schools in California
Catholic secondary schools in California
1898 establishments in California
Educational institutions established in 1898